The Kukui Heiau, near Wailua, Hawaii, also known as  'A'A Kukui  is a historic archeological site that is listed on the National Register of Historic Places.  It is the site of a heiau—a Hawaiian temple—on state land that was donated by neighboring condo developers.  It is now landscaped, but retains facing walls and offers a good view of Wailua Bay.
A  area was listed on the National Register of Historic Places in 1987.

References 

Archaeological sites on the National Register of Historic Places in Hawaii
Kauai County, Hawaii
Heiau
Archaeological sites in Hawaii
Protected areas established in 1987
1987 establishments in Hawaii